The Iveagh Markets  is a former indoor market built in the Edwardian architectural style on Francis Street and John Dillon Street in The Liberties neighbourhood of Dublin, Ireland, that was open from 1906 until the 1990s. As of 2020, the site remains derelict despite attempts to redevelop the site into a new food market complex.

History
Until the creation by The 1st Viscount Iveagh, as he then was, of the park north of St. Patrick's Cathedral in 1901, hundreds of street traders had stalls in the neighbourhood. Lord Iveagh (who was later created, in 1919, The 1st Earl of Iveagh) obtained an Act of Parliament to build and gift the markets, subject to the condition that they be run by Dublin Corporation as public markets or the title would revert to his heirs. The site for the markets was cleared by 1900, with the objective of the new indoor market to offer local traders a dry place to sell vegetables, fish, and clothes. It was built by the Iveagh Trust, which was initially a component of the Guinness Trust, founded in 1890 by Lord Iveagh. The building was designed and built by Frederick G. Hicks. Construction started in 1902 and the market opened in 1906. Maintenance of the market was entrusted to Dublin Corporation (now Dublin City Council). The market building was built in the Edwardian style.

The market was split into a dry market facing Francis Street and a wet market in the rear facing John Dillon Street. The dry market sold clothes while the wet market sold fish, fruit and vegetables.

An adjoining building housed laundry, disinfecting and delousing facilities. This was an innovation in the Dublin market world, and was influenced by Iveagh's sponsorship of the Lister Institute of Preventive Medicine in London a decade earlier.

Closure and restoration attempts
By the 1980s, the market had become rundown. In 1993, the council announced plans for a IR£1.25 million refurbishment. Over the following years, the sum was determined to be inadequate and the council announced in 1996 that it was seeking a private developer to redevelop the market. In 1997, hotelier Martin Keane secured a 500-year lease with a  tender. In 2007, Keane was granted planning permission to develop the market and an adjacent site into a food market complex with restaurants, a 97-bed hotel, music venue and apartment hotel. The planning permission was renewed in 2012, and a  redevelopment was expected to begin in spring 2015 and finish in 2017.

In January 2018, the city council announced that it would repossess the market site and refund Keane's  tender due to his failure to redevelop the site. In September 2019, an architectural condition report commissioned by the city council found that the market was "unsafe" and in an "advanced state of dereliction".

On 8 December 2020, it was revealed that The 4th Earl of Iveagh had commissioned a security team to gain occupancy and forcibly repossess the site in the early hours of that morning, citing the provisions in the 1901 Act that ownership would revert to the Guinness family if the site was not actively developed as a market. Lord Iveagh and the Iveagh Trustees Ltd. reported through a spokesman that they intended for the site to be developed "in a manner conforming with the wishes of the First Earl".

Gallery

References

External links
Iveagh Market Buildings on "Wide and Convenient Streets" website
Archived restoration project

Market halls
Markets in Dublin (city)